The following lists events that happened during 2014 in Brunei.

Events
The National Service Programme, ( - PKBN), a voluntary programme for Bruneian youths was made permanent in 2014, following its pilot study.

April
April 30 — the Sultan of Brunei has announced a controversial new penal code that will eventually include stoning, amputation, and flogging as punishments; as 'Phase one' of Islamic law.

References

 
2010s in Brunei
Years of the 21st century in Brunei
Brunei
Brunei